Thowsen is a surname. Notable people with the surname include:

Atle Thowsen (born 1940), Norwegian historian
Pål Thowsen (born 1955), Norwegian jazz drummer

See also
Thomsen